Bank One Center may refer to:

 Bank One Center (Houston), a building in Texas
 Bank One Center (Charleston), one of the tallest buildings in Charleston, West Virginia

Formerly named Bank One Center
 Comerica Bank Tower, in Dallas, Texas
 Chase Tower (Amarillo), Texas
 Chase Tower (Phoenix), Arizona
 Fifth Third Center (Cleveland), Cleveland, Ohio
 Place St. Charles, in New Orleans, Louisiana
 The Qube (Detroit), an office building

Formerly named Bank One Tower
 Salesforce Tower (Indianapolis), Indiana
 1125 17th Street, in Denver, Colorado
 Chase Tower (Oklahoma City), Oklahoma

See also
 Bank One Corporation, bank in the United States acquired by JPMorgan Chase in 2004
 Chase Tower (Chicago), building formerly named Bank One Plaza
 Chase Tower (Milwaukee), building formerly named Bank One Plaza